The Private Navy of Sgt. O'Farrell is a 1968 American comedy film directed by Frank Tashlin and starring Bob Hope, Phyllis Diller, and Jeffrey Hunter. It was the final film for Tashlin, who died in 1972.

Plot
Master Sergeant Dan O'Farrell is a G.I. on an island somewhere in the South Pacific during World War II, bemoaning the loss of a ship torpedoed while ferrying to the island a desperately needed cargo of beer.

Among his problems are the Navy personnel making life difficult for him and his Army buddies, an officer trying to emulate John Paul Jones, a hoped-for delivery of morale-boosting nurses turning out to be six men, the ugliest woman (Diller) ever to wilt a bouquet of flowers, and a Japanese soldier who has been hiding from everyone else and hiding something else as well.

Cast
Bob Hope as M/Sgt. Dan O'Farrell
Phyllis Diller as Nurse Nellie Krause
Jeffrey Hunter as Lt. (j.g.) Lyman P. Jones
John Myhers as Lt. Cdr. Roger N. Snavely
Mako as Calvin Coolidge Ishimura
Henry Wilcoxon as RAdm. Arthur L. Stokes
Dick Sargent as Capt. Elwood Prohaska
Christopher Dark as Pvt. George Strongbow
Michael Burns as Pvt. Johnny Bannon
William Wellman Jr. as Cpl. Kennedy
Robert Donner as Pvt. Ogg (USMC)
Jack Grinnage as Pvt. Roberts
William Christopher as Cpl. Jack Schultz (billed as a Pvt.)
Mylène Demongeot as Gaby
Gina Lollobrigida as Maria
John Spina as Cpl. Miller (uncredited)
Bing Crosby (archive footage from Pennies from Heaven) (uncredited)
Edith Fellows (archive footage from Pennies from Heaven) (uncredited)

Production
The film was an original story which was purchased by producer John Beck in 1965. He tried to set the project up at MGM, but after Bob Hope was attached, it was made via United Artists, where Hope had a deal in association with NBC.

The movie was filmed in Puerto Rico in 1967 with Hope at 64 years of age at the time; it was originally to have been filmed in Hawaii, but due to the activity during the Vietnam War, the US Department of Defense, which cooperated with the production, suggested the filming move to the Caribbean.

Reception
Renata Adler of The New York Times gave an unfavourable review, complaining about "the endless progression of unfunny lines." Roger Ebert of the Chicago Sun-Times stated, ". . . the striking thing about "The Private Navy of Sgt. O'Farrell" is how completely it neglects the humorous possibilities of film," although he found enough good in the tight storytelling, Frank Tashlin's directing and Mako's performance to award two-and-a half stars. Variety said it was "okay, but crudely plotted" and "routinely directed." Leonard Maltin stated, "Of the many terrible Hope comedies of the 1960s, this may be the worst," and gave it his rock-bottom rating of BOMB.

See also
List of American films of 1968

Notes

External links
 
 

1968 films
1968 comedy films
American comedy films
1960s English-language films
Films directed by Frank Tashlin
Films scored by Harry Sukman
Films shot in Puerto Rico
Pacific War films
Films with screenplays by Frank Tashlin
United Artists films
1960s American films